The 2001–02 Boston Bruins season was the Boston Bruins's 78th season of operation. The Bruins qualified for the playoffs, losing in the first round to the Montreal Canadiens.

Offseason
After barely missing the playoffs the previous season, the Bruins went on a free-agent signing spree under new general manager Mike O'Connell. The team signed high-profile free agents: forwards Martin Lapointe, Bill Guerin, Rob Zamuner, and Scott Pellerin, and defenseman Sean O'Donnell.

Two more major pieces for the Bruins came thanks to a contract holdout by captain Jason Allison. After failing to report to training camp and missing all of the pre-season, Allison was traded to the Los Angeles Kings in exchange for two former Bruins: Glen Murray and Jozef Stumpel. The two proved to be invaluable to the team, as Stumpel led the team in assists and Murray finished second on the team in goals, more than making up for Allison's production.

Regular season
On October 25, 2001, Joe Thornton scored just 12 seconds into the overtime period to give the Bruins a 2–1 home win over the Toronto Maple Leafs. It would prove to be the fastest overtime goal scored during the 2001–02 regular season.

The Bruins finished the regular season with the highest penalty-kill percentage, at 87.11%.

Final standings

Playoffs

Schedule and results

Regular season

|- align="center" bgcolor="#CCFFCC" 
|1||W||October 4, 2001||4–2 || align="left"|  Mighty Ducks of Anaheim (2001–02) ||1–0–0–0 || 
|- align="center" bgcolor="#CCFFCC" 
|2||W||October 6, 2001||4–3 OT|| align="left"|  Atlanta Thrashers (2001–02) ||2–0–0–0 || 
|- align="center" bgcolor="#CCFFCC" 
|3||W||October 8, 2001||4–0 || align="left"|  Washington Capitals (2001–02) ||3–0–0–0 || 
|- align="center" bgcolor="#FFBBBB"
|4||L||October 10, 2001||1–2 || align="left"| @ Minnesota Wild (2001–02) ||3–1–0–0 || 
|- align="center" bgcolor="#FFBBBB"
|5||L||October 13, 2001||2–3 || align="left"| @ San Jose Sharks (2001–02) ||3–2–0–0 || 
|- align="center" 
|6||T||October 16, 2001||1–1 OT|| align="left"| @ Phoenix Coyotes (2001–02) ||3–2–1–0 || 
|- align="center" 
|7||T||October 17, 2001||2–2 OT|| align="left"| @ Mighty Ducks of Anaheim (2001–02) ||3–2–2–0 || 
|- align="center" bgcolor="#CCFFCC" 
|8||W||October 20, 2001||2–1 || align="left"| @ Nashville Predators (2001–02) ||4–2–2–0 || 
|- align="center" bgcolor="#FFBBBB"
|9||L||October 23, 2001||0–2 || align="left"| @ Toronto Maple Leafs (2001–02) ||4–3–2–0 || 
|- align="center" bgcolor="#CCFFCC" 
|10||W||October 25, 2001||2–1 OT|| align="left"|  Toronto Maple Leafs (2001–02) ||5–3–2–0 || 
|- align="center" bgcolor="#FF6F6F"
|11||OTL||October 27, 2001||1–2 OT|| align="left"|  New York Rangers (2001–02) ||5–3–2–1 || 
|- align="center" 
|12||T||October 28, 2001||3–3 OT|| align="left"| @ Chicago Blackhawks (2001–02) ||5–3–3–1 || 
|- align="center" bgcolor="#FF6F6F"
|13||OTL||October 30, 2001||3–4 OT|| align="left"|  New Jersey Devils (2001–02) ||5–3–3–2 || 
|-

|- align="center" bgcolor="#CCFFCC" 
|14||W||November 3, 2001||2–1 || align="left"| @ New Jersey Devils (2001–02) ||6–3–3–2 || 
|- align="center" bgcolor="#CCFFCC" 
|15||W||November 6, 2001||1–0 OT|| align="left"|  Edmonton Oilers (2001–02) ||7–3–3–2 || 
|- align="center" bgcolor="#FFBBBB"
|16||L||November 8, 2001||3–5 || align="left"|  Minnesota Wild (2001–02) ||7–4–3–2 || 
|- align="center" bgcolor="#FFBBBB"
|17||L||November 10, 2001||1–5 || align="left"|  Columbus Blue Jackets (2001–02) ||7–5–3–2 || 
|- align="center" bgcolor="#CCFFCC" 
|18||W||November 13, 2001||5–3 || align="left"|  Montreal Canadiens (2001–02) ||8–5–3–2 || 
|- align="center" bgcolor="#CCFFCC" 
|19||W||November 15, 2001||5–4 OT|| align="left"|  New Jersey Devils (2001–02) ||9–5–3–2 || 
|- align="center" bgcolor="#CCFFCC" 
|20||W||November 17, 2001||3–1 || align="left"|  Buffalo Sabres (2001–02) ||10–5–3–2 || 
|- align="center" bgcolor="#FFBBBB"
|21||L||November 20, 2001||2–3 || align="left"| @ Montreal Canadiens (2001–02) ||10–6–3–2 || 
|- align="center" bgcolor="#CCFFCC" 
|22||W||November 23, 2001||3–2 || align="left"|  Vancouver Canucks (2001–02) ||11–6–3–2 || 
|- align="center" bgcolor="#FFBBBB"
|23||L||November 24, 2001||0–2 || align="left"| @ Toronto Maple Leafs (2001–02) ||11–7–3–2 || 
|- align="center" bgcolor="#CCFFCC" 
|24||W||November 27, 2001||6–3 || align="left"|  Tampa Bay Lightning (2001–02) ||12–7–3–2 || 
|- align="center" bgcolor="#CCFFCC" 
|25||W||November 29, 2001||3–2 OT|| align="left"| @ Philadelphia Flyers (2001–02) ||13–7–3–2 || 
|-

|- align="center" bgcolor="#FF6F6F"
|26||OTL||December 1, 2001||1–2 OT|| align="left"| @ Ottawa Senators (2001–02) ||13–7–3–3 || 
|- align="center" bgcolor="#CCFFCC" 
|27||W||December 4, 2001||3–2 || align="left"| @ Atlanta Thrashers (2001–02) ||14–7–3–3 || 
|- align="center" bgcolor="#FFBBBB"
|28||L||December 6, 2001||1–4 || align="left"|  Pittsburgh Penguins (2001–02) ||14–8–3–3 || 
|- align="center" bgcolor="#CCFFCC" 
|29||W||December 8, 2001||4–2 || align="left"|  Buffalo Sabres (2001–02) ||15–8–3–3 || 
|- align="center" bgcolor="#CCFFCC" 
|30||W||December 12, 2001||4–2 || align="left"| @ Pittsburgh Penguins (2001–02) ||16–8–3–3 || 
|- align="center" bgcolor="#FFBBBB"
|31||L||December 13, 2001||1–2 || align="left"| @ Washington Capitals (2001–02) ||16–9–3–3 || 
|- align="center" bgcolor="#FFBBBB"
|32||L||December 15, 2001||2–5 || align="left"|  Philadelphia Flyers (2001–02) ||16–10–3–3 || 
|- align="center" bgcolor="#FF6F6F"
|33||OTL||December 18, 2001||2–3 OT|| align="left"|  Atlanta Thrashers (2001–02) ||16–10–3–4 || 
|- align="center" bgcolor="#CCFFCC" 
|34||W||December 20, 2001||5–0 || align="left"|  Montreal Canadiens (2001–02) ||17–10–3–4 || 
|- align="center" bgcolor="#CCFFCC" 
|35||W||December 22, 2001||4–2 || align="left"| @ New York Islanders (2001–02) ||18–10–3–4 || 
|- align="center" bgcolor="#CCFFCC" 
|36||W||December 26, 2001||3–2 || align="left"|  Ottawa Senators (2001–02) ||19–10–3–4 || 
|- align="center" bgcolor="#CCFFCC" 
|37||W||December 28, 2001||7–1 || align="left"| @ Florida Panthers (2001–02) ||20–10–3–4 || 
|- align="center" bgcolor="#CCFFCC" 
|38||W||December 29, 2001||5–4 OT|| align="left"| @ Tampa Bay Lightning (2001–02) ||21–10–3–4 || 
|- align="center" bgcolor="#FFBBBB"
|39||L||December 31, 2001||1–2 || align="left"| @ Dallas Stars (2001–02) ||21–11–3–4 || 
|-

|- align="center" bgcolor="#CCFFCC" 
|40||W||January 2, 2002||6–3 || align="left"| @ Carolina Hurricanes (2001–02) ||22–11–3–4 || 
|- align="center" bgcolor="#FFBBBB"
|41||L||January 3, 2002||1–2 || align="left"|  Toronto Maple Leafs (2001–02) ||22–12–3–4 || 
|- align="center" bgcolor="#CCFFCC" 
|42||W||January 5, 2002||7–4 || align="left"|  Washington Capitals (2001–02) ||23–12–3–4 || 
|- align="center" bgcolor="#CCFFCC" 
|43||W||January 8, 2002||3–2 || align="left"| @ Pittsburgh Penguins (2001–02) ||24–12–3–4 || 
|- align="center" bgcolor="#CCFFCC" 
|44||W||January 10, 2002||5–0 || align="left"|  Los Angeles Kings (2001–02) ||25–12–3–4 || 
|- align="center" bgcolor="#FFBBBB"
|45||L||January 12, 2002||4–5 || align="left"|  New York Islanders (2001–02) ||25–13–3–4 || 
|- align="center" bgcolor="#FF6F6F"
|46||OTL||January 14, 2002||0–1 OT|| align="left"| @ Washington Capitals (2001–02) ||25–13–3–5 || 
|- align="center" bgcolor="#CCFFCC" 
|47||W||January 17, 2002||5–2 || align="left"|  Ottawa Senators (2001–02) ||26–13–3–5 || 
|- align="center" bgcolor="#FF6F6F"
|48||OTL||January 19, 2002||1–2 OT|| align="left"| @ St. Louis Blues (2001–02) ||26–13–3–6 || 
|- align="center" bgcolor="#FF6F6F"
|49||OTL||January 21, 2002||3–4 OT|| align="left"|  St. Louis Blues (2001–02) ||26–13–3–7 || 
|- align="center" bgcolor="#FFBBBB"
|50||L||January 23, 2002||4–8 || align="left"| @ New York Rangers (2001–02) ||26–14–3–7 || 
|- align="center" bgcolor="#FFBBBB"
|51||L||January 24, 2002||3–4 || align="left"| @ Ottawa Senators (2001–02) ||26–15–3–7 || 
|- align="center" bgcolor="#CCFFCC" 
|52||W||January 26, 2002||4–2 || align="left"|  Florida Panthers (2001–02) ||27–15–3–7 || 
|- align="center" bgcolor="#CCFFCC" 
|53||W||January 28, 2002||2–1 || align="left"|  Chicago Blackhawks (2001–02) ||28–15–3–7 || 
|- align="center" bgcolor="#CCFFCC" 
|54||W||January 30, 2002||4–3 OT|| align="left"| @ Montreal Canadiens (2001–02) ||29–15–3–7 || 
|-

|- align="center" bgcolor="#CCFFCC" 
|55||W||February 4, 2002||8–0 || align="left"| @ Columbus Blue Jackets (2001–02) ||30–15–3–7 || 
|- align="center" 
|56||T||February 5, 2002||2–2 OT|| align="left"|  Buffalo Sabres (2001–02) ||30–15–4–7 || 
|- align="center" bgcolor="#CCFFCC" 
|57||W||February 9, 2002||4–1 || align="left"|  Florida Panthers (2001–02) ||31–15–4–7 || 
|- align="center" bgcolor="#FFBBBB"
|58||L||February 11, 2002||2–5 || align="left"| @ Colorado Avalanche (2001–02) ||31–16–4–7 || 
|- align="center" bgcolor="#CCFFCC" 
|59||W||February 12, 2002||2–1 OT|| align="left"| @ Vancouver Canucks (2001–02) ||32–16–4–7 || 
|- align="center" 
|60||T||February 26, 2002||3–3 OT|| align="left"| @ New York Islanders (2001–02) ||32–16–5–7 || 
|- align="center" bgcolor="#FFBBBB"
|61||L||February 28, 2002||2–6 || align="left"|  Carolina Hurricanes (2001–02) ||32–17–5–7 || 
|-

|- align="center" bgcolor="#FFBBBB"
|62||L||March 1, 2002||3–4 || align="left"| @ Buffalo Sabres (2001–02) ||32–18–5–7 || 
|- align="center" bgcolor="#FFBBBB"
|63||L||March 4, 2002||1–4 || align="left"|  Philadelphia Flyers (2001–02) ||32–19–5–7 || 
|- align="center" bgcolor="#FFBBBB"
|64||L||March 6, 2002||3–5 || align="left"| @ Montreal Canadiens (2001–02) ||32–20–5–7 || 
|- align="center" bgcolor="#CCFFCC" 
|65||W||March 8, 2002||3–0 || align="left"| @ Atlanta Thrashers (2001–02) ||33–20–5–7 || 
|- align="center" bgcolor="#CCFFCC" 
|66||W||March 9, 2002||3–2 || align="left"|  Calgary Flames (2001–02) ||34–20–5–7 || 
|- align="center" bgcolor="#CCFFCC" 
|67||W||March 13, 2002||3–1 || align="left"| @ New York Rangers (2001–02) ||35–20–5–7 || 
|- align="center" bgcolor="#FFBBBB"
|68||L||March 14, 2002||1–2 || align="left"|  Toronto Maple Leafs (2001–02) ||35–21–5–7 || 
|- align="center" bgcolor="#CCFFCC" 
|69||W||March 16, 2002||2–1 || align="left"|  Detroit Red Wings (2001–02) ||36–21–5–7 || 
|- align="center" bgcolor="#CCFFCC" 
|70||W||March 19, 2002||4–2 || align="left"|  Phoenix Coyotes (2001–02) ||37–21–5–7 || 
|- align="center" bgcolor="#CCFFCC" 
|71||W||March 21, 2002||2–1 || align="left"| @ Buffalo Sabres (2001–02) ||38–21–5–7 || 
|- align="center" bgcolor="#CCFFCC" 
|72||W||March 23, 2002||3–1 || align="left"| @ Florida Panthers (2001–02) ||39–21–5–7 || 
|- align="center" bgcolor="#CCFFCC" 
|73||W||March 24, 2002||4–3 OT|| align="left"| @ Tampa Bay Lightning (2001–02) ||40–21–5–7 || 
|- align="center" bgcolor="#CCFFCC" 
|74||W||March 26, 2002||3–2 || align="left"| @ Carolina Hurricanes (2001–02) ||41–21–5–7 || 
|- align="center" bgcolor="#FFBBBB"
|75||L||March 30, 2002||0–2 || align="left"|  Carolina Hurricanes (2001–02) ||41–22–5–7 || 
|-

|- align="center" bgcolor="#CCFFCC" 
|76||W||April 2, 2002||4–2 || align="left"| @ Philadelphia Flyers (2001–02) ||42–22–5–7 || 
|- align="center" bgcolor="#FF6F6F"
|77||OTL||April 4, 2002||1–2 OT|| align="left"|  New York Islanders (2001–02) ||42–22–5–8 || 
|- align="center" bgcolor="#FFBBBB"
|78||L||April 6, 2002||4–6 || align="left"|  New York Rangers (2001–02) ||42–23–5–8 || 
|- align="center" bgcolor="#FF6F6F"
|79||OTL||April 7, 2002||2–3 OT|| align="left"| @ New Jersey Devils (2001–02) ||42–23–5–9 || 
|- align="center" 
|80||T||April 9, 2002||2–2 OT|| align="left"|  Tampa Bay Lightning (2001–02) ||42–23–6–9 || 
|- align="center" bgcolor="#FFBBBB"
|81||L||April 11, 2002||0–4 || align="left"| @ Ottawa Senators (2001–02) ||42–24–6–9 || 
|- align="center" bgcolor="#CCFFCC" 
|82||W||April 13, 2002||7–1 || align="left"|  Pittsburgh Penguins (2001–02) ||43–24–6–9 || 
|-

|-
| Legend:

Playoffs

|- align="center" bgcolor="#FFBBBB"
| 1 ||L|| April 18, 2002 || 2–5 || align="left"| Montreal Canadiens || Canadiens lead 1–0 || 
|- align="center" bgcolor="#CCFFCC"
| 2 ||W|| April 21, 2002 || 6–4 || align="left"| Montreal Canadiens || Series tied 1–1 || 
|- align="center" bgcolor="#FFBBBB"
| 3 ||L|| April 23, 2002 || 3–5 || align="left"| @ Montreal Canadiens || Canadiens lead 2–1 || 
|- align="center" bgcolor="#CCFFCC"
| 4 ||W|| April 25, 2002 || 5–2 || align="left"| @ Montreal Canadiens || Series tied 2–2 || 
|- align="center" bgcolor="#FFBBBB"
| 5 ||L|| April 27, 2002 || 1–2 || align="left"| Montreal Canadiens || Canadiens lead 3–2 || 
|- align="center" bgcolor="#FFBBBB"
| 6 ||L|| April 29, 2002 || 1–2 || align="left"| @ Montreal Canadiens || Canadiens win 4–2 || 
|-

|-
| Legend:

Player statistics

Scoring
 Position abbreviations: C = Center; D = Defense; G = Goaltender; LW = Left Wing; RW = Right Wing
  = Joined team via a transaction (e.g., trade, waivers, signing) during the season. Stats reflect time with the Bruins only.
  = Left team via a transaction (e.g., trade, waivers, release) during the season. Stats reflect time with the Bruins only.

Goaltending

Awards and records

Transactions
The Bruins were involved in the following transactions from June 10, 2001, the day after the deciding game of the 2001 Stanley Cup Finals, through June 13, 2002, the day of the deciding game of the 2002 Stanley Cup Finals.

Trades

Players acquired

Players lost

Signings

Draft picks
Boston's draft picks at the 2001 NHL Entry Draft held at the National Car Rental Center in Sunrise, Florida.

See also
2001–02 NHL season

Notes

References

Boston Bruins
Boston Bruins
Boston Bruins seasons
Boston Bruins
Boston Bruins
Bruins
Bruins